The Samoa national under-17 football team is the national U-17 team of Samoa and is controlled by Football Federation Samoa.

History

Competition Record

FIFA U-17 World Cup record

OFC U-17 Championship record
The OFC U-17 Championship is a tournament held once every two years to decide the only two qualification spots for the Oceania Football Confederation (OFC) and its representatives at the FIFA U-17 World Cup.

Current squad
The following players have been called up for the squad for the 2023 OFC U-17 Championship from 11 to 28 January 2023.

2018 squad
The following players have been called up for the squad for the 2018 OFC U-16 Championship from 9 to 22 September 2018.

Results and Fixtures

2016

2017

2018

List Of Coaches
  Malo Vaga (2013)
  Desmond Fa'aiuaso (2015–2017)
  Martin Tamasese (2018–)

Notes

References

External links
Samoa Football Federation official website

Football in Samoa
under-17
Oceanian national under-17 association football teams